The 1990–91 Boise State Broncos men's basketball team represented Boise State University during the 1990–91 NCAA Division I men's basketball season. The Broncos were led by eighth-year head coach Bobby Dye and played their home games on campus at the BSU Pavilion in Boise, Idaho.

In the conference tournament at Missoula, Montana, the fourth-seeded Broncos lost by four points to fifth seed Idaho State in the quarterfinals. Boise State received a bid to the National Invitation Tournament (NIT) and hosted a first round game, but lost to Southern Illinois by a point.

Postseason results

|-
!colspan=6 style=| Big Sky tournament

|-
!colspan=6 style=| National Invitation tournament

References

External links
Sports Reference – Boise State Broncos – 1990–91 basketball season

Boise State Broncos men's basketball seasons
Boise State
Boise State
Boise State